Addiction by Design is a 2012 non-fiction book by Natasha Dow Schüll and published by Princeton University Press that describes machine gambling in Las Vegas.  It offers an analysis of machine gambling and the intensified forms of consumption that computer-based technologies enable and the innovations that deliberately enhance and sustain the 'zone' which extreme machine gamblers yearn for.

The book received attention in connection with how current information technologies, in certain contexts, can make people addicted.

See also
 Addiction psychology
 Slot machine
 Compulsion loop

References

External links
 Chris Hedges and Professor Natasha Dow Schüll discuss the research reported in her book (2017-03-28). Video, 26 min

Product design
Ethically disputed business practices
Works about addiction
Human–computer interaction
Works about gambling
2012 non-fiction books
American non-fiction books
Princeton University Press books